Calliobdella is a genus of annelids belonging to the family Piscicolidae.

The species of this genus are found in Europe and Northern America.

Species:

Calliobdella knightjonesi 
Calliobdella lophii 
Calliobdella mammillata 
Calliobdella nodulifera 
Calliobdella punctata

References

Annelids